Sripada Kameswara Rao (1877–1943) was an actor, translator and speaker. He translated Marathi, Oriya, Tamil, French and Punjabi dramas to Telugu. He published numerous reviews, such as one on the play Kanyasulkam, that was published in 1933 in the Telugu literary journal Bharathi.

Rao translated other scholars' writings, such as Dwijendra Lal Rai's and P. C. Vasu's contributions to dramatic and literary criticism, into Telugu prose. He was a scholar who was well-versed in Eastern and Western culture.

Books 
 Kalapahad (1913)
 Bharatharamani
 Tagina sasthi
 Lilavathi sulochanalu
 Sahitya meemamsa
 Chandragupta
 Sri madhavacharya vidyaranyaswamy
 Pisinigottu
 Punarvivahamu
 Ranapratapasing naatakamu.

References

1877 births
1943 deaths
Indian male stage actors
Telugu writers
English translators
French translators
Telugu-language dramatists and playwrights
Hindi–Telugu translators
Male actors in British India
Writers in British India